Farès Benabderahmane (born August 11, 1987, in Sidi Aïssa) is an Algerian football player. He currently plays for USM El Harrach in the Algerian Ligue Professionnelle 2.

Club career
On July 12, 2011, Benabderahmane signed a two-year contract with CR Belouizdad.

Honours

Club
USM El Harrach
 Algerian Cup: Runners-up 2011

USM Bel Abbès
 Algerian Cup: 2018

References

External links
 DZFoot Profile
 

1987 births
Algerian footballers
Algerian Ligue Professionnelle 1 players
People from Sidi Aïssa
ASO Chlef players
CR Belouizdad players
NA Hussein Dey players
USM El Harrach players
ES Sétif players
RC Relizane players
USM Bel Abbès players
Living people
Association football defenders
21st-century Algerian people